The Cowley County Courthouse, located at 311 East 9th Avenue in Winfield, is the seat of government of Cowley County, Kansas. Winfield has been the county seat since 1867. The courthouse was built from 1961 to 1962 by contractor Law-Pollitt Construction Company of Wichita, Kansas. 

Caton, Yadon & Potter of Winfield and Stitzel & Thoma of Arkansas City, Kansas designed the courthouse in the Modern style. The courthouse is located on landscaped grounds on the city's west side. It is two stories and faces north. It is constructed of buff-colored brick and concrete with a flat roof. Adjoining the right side of the entrance is a large, two-story projection with a concrete map of the county showing the townships, cities, and rivers.

The first courthouse was constructed in 1873 by Steart & Simpson. It received an addition in 1885 constructed by Abe Smith and designed by Terry & Dumont. The second courthouse was built in 1901 by Manhattan Construction Company and designed by Patrick Henry Weathers of Jackson, Mississippi.

See also
 List of county courthouses in Kansas

External links
 Cowley County Courthouse at Kansas Memory
 Cowley County at American Courthouses
 Historic postcard images

Buildings and structures in Cowley County, Kansas
County courthouses in Kansas
Modernist architecture in Kansas
Government buildings completed in 1962